The 2005 Rhein Fire season was the 11th season for the franchise in the NFL Europe League (NFLEL). The team was led by head coach Pete Kuharchek in his fifth year, and played its home games at the newly built LTU arena in Düsseldorf, Germany. They finished the regular season in sixth place with a record of three wins and seven losses.

Offseason

Free agent draft

Personnel

Staff

Roster

Schedule

Standings

Game summaries

Week 1: at Amsterdam Admirals

Week 2: vs Cologne Centurions

Week 3: at Hamburg Sea Devils

Week 4: vs Berlin Thunder

Week 5: at Frankfurt Galaxy

Week 6: vs Hamburg Sea Devils

Week 7: at Berlin Thunder

Week 8: vs Frankfurt Galaxy

Week 9: at Cologne Centurions

Week 10: vs Amsterdam Admirals

Notes

References

Rhein
Rhein Fire seasons
Rhein
Rhein